Eero Huovinen (born October 27, 1944, in Helsinki) is the former Bishop of Helsinki in the Evangelical Lutheran Church of Finland.

Biography 

Eero Huovinen was born in Helsinki, the son of the Revd Dr Lauri Huovinen (1915–1994), Dean of the Cathedral of Turku. He studied at the University of Helsinki, graduating with a Master of Theology 1970; Licentiate of Theology 1976; and PhD in 1978.

Huovinen was ordained into the priesthood in 1970. Between 1970 and 1991 he held various positions at the University of Helsinki Faculty of Theology, including Professor of Dogmatics and Dean of the Faculty. He was appointed as Bishop of Helsinki on March 1, 1991, and retired in 2010.

References 

1944 births
Living people
Lutheran bishops of Helsinki
Finnish Lutheran theologians
Academic staff of the University of Helsinki
20th-century Lutheran bishops
21st-century Lutheran bishops
20th-century Protestant theologians